Engines of Creation: The Coming Era of Nanotechnology is a 1986 molecular nanotechnology book written by K. Eric Drexler with a foreword by Marvin Minsky. An updated version was released in 2007.   The book has been translated into Japanese, French, Spanish, Italian, Russian, and Chinese.

Synopsis
The book features nanotechnology, which Richard Feynman had discussed in his 1959 speech "There's Plenty of Room at the Bottom."  Drexler imagines a world where the entire Library of Congress can fit on a chip the size of a sugar cube and where universal assemblers, tiny machines that can build objects atom by atom, will be used for everything from medicinal robots that help clear capillaries to environmental scrubbers that clear pollutants from the air.  In the book, Drexler proposes the gray goo scenario—one prediction of what might happen if molecular nanotechnology were used to build uncontrollable self-replicating machines.

Topics also include hypertext as developed by Project Xanadu and life extension. Drexler takes a Malthusian view of exponential growth within limits to growth. He also promotes space advocacy, arguing that, because the universe is essentially infinite, life can escape the limits to growth defined by Earth.  Drexler supports a form of the Fermi paradox, arguing that as there is no evidence of alien civilizations, "Thus for now, and perhaps forever, we can make plans for our future without concern for limits imposed by other civilizations."

Nanosystems (1992)
Drexler's 1992 book, Nanosystems: molecular machinery, manufacturing, and computation is a technical treatment of similar material. Nanosystems addresses chemical, thermodynamic, and other constraints on nanotechnology and manufacturing.

Engines of Creation 2.0 (2007)
An updated version of the book, Engines of Creation 2.0, which includes more recent papers and publications, was published as a free ebook on February 8, 2007.

Reception
The book and the theories it presents have been the subject of some controversy. Scientists such as Nobel Laureate Richard Smalley and renowned chemist George M. Whitesides have been particularly critical. Smalley has engaged in open debate with Drexler, attacking the views presented for what he considered both the dubious nature of the science behind them, and the misleading effect on the public's view of nanotechnology.

See also
The Limits to Growth, 1972 report
 Planetary boundaries

References

External links
Full text of version 1.0 (1986)
Full text in Italian: MOTORI DI CREAZIONE - L'era prossima della nanotecnologia
Full text in Chinese: 创造的发动机
Drexler's personal website and digital archive
Biography of K. Eric Drexler
"Engines of Creation – Nanotechnology Will Save Us" Synopsis by Dan Geddes

1986 non-fiction books
1986 in the environment
Nanotechnology books
Futurology books